Deafening may refer to:

 An action causing deafness
Deafening (novel), a 2003 novel by Frances Itani
"Deafening", a song from the 2010 Disciple album Horseshoes & Handgrenades
"Deafening", a song from the 2010 Far album At Night We Live
"Deafening", a song by Pat Boone from the 1968  album Look Ahead
"Deafening", a song  by From Monument to Masses from the 2005 album Schools of Thought Contend
"Deafening", a song  by Bruce Bouillet from the 2013 album The Order of Control